Ignacio Loyola Vera (born 10 September 1954) is a Mexican politician. A member of the National Action Party, he served as Governor of Querétaro from 1 October 1997 to 30 September 2003.

Career
Born in Querétaro City, Loyola obtained a B.Sc. in Agricultural Engineering and Zootechnology at the ITESM. Before politics he was the director of his own agricultural business, an advisor to COPARMEX (1992–1994), vice-president of the Society of Agricultural Engineers and Parasitologists (1993–1995), advisor to CANACO (1994–1996) and director of COPARMEX in Querétaro (1996).

With no previous political experience, he ran for the governorship of Querétaro in 1997. In a surprising victory he defeated Fernando Ortiz Arana Institutional Revolutionary Party (PRI). He approved the construction of the new international airport, which began in 2002 and was inaugurated in 2004 by his successor. During his term, he accomplished the construction of the International Airport of Querétaro, The Ecocentro Expositor, The Cultural Center Gómez Morín, and the Hospital del Niño y la Mujer, among others. Querétaro also improved in different veins such as tourism, employment, security, Economic Development and less corruption.

In 2001, when the political group denominated "zapatistas" organized a march through several sections of the country until they reached the Mexican capital, Loyola confronted subcommander Marcos, making notice of whether or not the EZLN was worthy of being called an army.

Advisor to the SCT, prepared studies for the high-speed train project from Mexico City to Guadalajara
He served as Federal Attorney of Environmental Protection under President Felipe Calderón from December 2006 to January 2008.

References

External links

Federal Attorney of Environmental Protection Website

Living people
1954 births
Governors of Querétaro
Members of the Chamber of Deputies (Mexico) for Querétaro
National Action Party (Mexico) politicians
Mexican people of Basque descent
Monterrey Institute of Technology and Higher Education alumni
20th-century Mexican politicians
21st-century Mexican politicians
Politicians from Querétaro
People from Querétaro City
Deputies of the LXV Legislature of Mexico